Michail Marinov Goleminov (2 June 1956 – 26 February 2022) was a Bulgarian pianist, conductor and composer.

Life and career
Goleminov was born in Bulgaria, and was the son of composer Marin Goleminov. He studied composition with Dimitar Tapkoff and Konstantin Iliev and conducting with Konstantin Iliev at the State Music Conservatory in Sofia, then in 1985 continued his musical education in Austria and Holland with Roman Haubenstock-Ramati, Ton de Leeuw, Alexander Baltin (composition), Karl Österreicher (conducting), and Harald Ossberger (piano). He also studied electroacoustic music with Dieter Kaufmann at Institute for Electroacoustic Music in Vienna.

Between 1992 and 1998 he collaborated in a series of theatrical productions in Austria and took part in projects involving contemporary arts, mixed media, and intuitive and computer music.

A participant in various concerts as pianist, composer, and conductor, he is the recipient of such international composition prizes as the Hambacher Preis, Sommerliche Musiktage Hitzacker, Carl Maria von Weber.

His works span a wide spectrum of styles and genres, from chamber and orchestral pieces to computer music, video-compositions and music graphs, and have been commissioned by the Vienna Konzerthaus, Quebec New Music Society (Montreal), the MELO-x Saxophone Quartet, and other leading organizations and ensembles.

Goleminov worked as a freelance musician based in Sofia, and he was the co-founder of Orange Factory psychoacoustic arts (http://orangefactory.net), an experimental center for musical creation, performance, publication, and education.

He died on 26 February 2022, at the age of 65.

Musical works
'Floating metal' for piano
Sonatina, 10 piano pieces
'Piano people' (two pianos)
'Revelation' for two pianos
'Illusion valley' for two pianos and electronics ad lib.
'Maze of Ravings' for two pianos and electronics
GALILEO for piano and electronics
BLOW for flute
FRITZ, MY FIRE concert study for piano, Friedrich Gulda in memoriam
"Music of melting ice" for piano
'Coyote' for saxophone quartet and live electronics
'VOX' for saxophone quartet, vocals and electronics
"Five o'clock at Heiner Stadler's" for violin, piano and electronics
'Chain Wheel' for cello, piano and electronics
'Lightwave' II for large orchestra and electronics
"Incoherent.... lay-by" for chamber ensemble
String quartet
Contemplations - musical graphics
CONCERTO in c minor for two pianos
Gladiator for two percussionists and live electronics
HYPERKLAVIER for piano and live electronics
Béla Bartók's Heart for large orchestra, electronics and video
Implicitly for piano left hand
MAGRITTE-ETUDES for one or two pianos and video
TRANSFIGURATIONS OF SUNRISE for large orchestra
LE VOYEUR for bass clarinet and live electronics
INEVITABLE FLASHBACK for bass clarinet and electronics
ILLUSION VALLEY for two pianos and electronics
Prelude and Fugue for piano and live electronics
The Double Live of Dr. Schoenberg for alto saxophone and live electronics
PARLIAMENT piano and electronics
Silicon Concerto for artificial intelligence and any number of soloists
7 piano etudes
Electronic music and music for instruments and live electronics
Generative music software (for Windows) for live performance and experimental purposes - HYPERKLAVIER, ANTHILL, DR. SCHOENBERG, ALEXANDER SCRIABIN - Paint-shop, Ltd., TOTAL-J, CYCLOPS, SILICON CONCERT0, SYNAESTYZER, E_SHAKESPEARE
Music for theater, TV and video

References

External links
Michail Goleminov's scores are available for free download in PDF format: http://orangefactory.net/scores
 

1956 births
2022 deaths
20th-century classical composers
20th-century conductors (music)
20th-century male musicians
21st-century classical composers
21st-century conductors (music)
21st-century male musicians
21st-century pianists
Bulgarian classical composers
Bulgarian conductors (music)
Bulgarian pianists
Male classical composers
Male pianists